Thomas Grieve may refer to:

Thomas Grieve (painter) (1799–1882), English painter
Tom Grieve (born 1948), American  baseball player
Tom Grieve (footballer) (1875–1948), football outside right